The Art of Partying is the third studio album from the crossover thrash band Municipal Waste, released on June 12, 2007, through Earache Records. A limited edition version was also released at the same time, containing two bonus tracks and including a free woven patch.

The band released a video for "Headbanger Face Rip," which was filmed with independent B-movie house, Troma Entertainment. The  features footage from Troma Films, including The Toxic Avenger and its sequels.  They followed up with a video for "Sadistic Magician".

The cover is the bands' visual representation of the song "Chemically Altered."

Track listing
All songs written by Municipal Waste.

Personnel
Tony "Guardrail" Foresta – vocals
Dave Witte – drums
Philip "LandPhil" Hall – bass, vocals
Ryan Waste – guitar, vocals, logo
Zeuss – recording, mixing, production
Alan Douches – mastering
Andrei Bouzikov – front and back cover painting
Mark Reategui – layout
Jim "Barf" Callahan – additional logo and album font
David Kenedy – band photos

References

External links
kvltsite.com review

Municipal Waste (band) albums
2007 albums
Earache Records albums
Albums produced by Chris "Zeuss" Harris